Boreotrophon truncatus, common name the bobtail trophon, is a species of sea snail, a marine gastropod mollusk in the family Muricidae, the murex snails or rock snails.

Description

Distribution

References

Molluscs described in 1768
Taxa named by Hans Strøm
Boreotrophon